Alexey Alexandrovich Zhigalkovich (born 18 April 1996 in Minsk) is a Belarusian singer. He participated in the Junior Eurovision Song Contest 2007 and won with one point more than the Armenian runner up. He sang the song "S druz'yami". It was a song with a fast tempo and energetic dancing. He wrote this song himself.

He was the second winner of this contest from Belarus, after Ksenia Sitnik in 2005.

Alexey is a prize-winner of several other international musical contests in Belarus, Italy and Bulgaria:
2005: He sang Lo zio Bé (Дзе каза рогам) at the Italian song contest Zecchino d'Oro. The song won the Zecchino d'Argento prize for the best non-Italian song.
2006: II prize for children singers at the Slavianski Bazaar in Vitebsk

References

External links

1996 births
Living people
Musicians from Minsk
Junior Eurovision Song Contest entrants for Belarus
Junior Eurovision Song Contest winners
Belarusian child singers
21st-century Belarusian male singers
Zecchino d'Oro singers